Giovanni Battista Egisto Sivelli (November 22, 1843 – November 1, 1934) was an Italian military veteran and the last surviving soldier of the Expedition of the Thousand. At age 16, Sivelli secretly fled his home and joined Giuseppe Garibaldi in May, 1860. Having been present in every battle of the expedition, he was discharged as a lieutenant. In 1866, Sivelli joined the Italian Army and fought in the Third Italian War of Independence. On May 5, 1915, he, along with a few other survivors, were present at the revealing of a new monument dedicated to the Thousand. Sivelli died on November 1, 1934.

References

1843 births
1934 deaths
Military personnel from Genoa
Italian people of the Italian unification